Nyctimystes is a genus of tree frogs in the subfamily Pelodryadinae of the family Hylidae. They are principally Papuan species, but also inhabit islands in the Moluccas. All species in this genus have one distinct feature that separates them from other species in the family, the lower eyelid is marked with pattern of lines, veins, or dots. This feature presumably acts as camouflage when the frogs are at rest during the day.

Species of this genus inhabit tropical or subtropical montane rainforest. The eggs are large and are laid on submerged objects in fast-flowing creeks and streams (not all species of this genus have been recorded as doing this, although it is assumed). The tadpoles have large sucker-mouths and their body shapes are very streamlined with large tail musculatures. All species of this genus have extensive webbing and large toe discs.

Species
Many of the species have relatively small population sizes, and not much is known about either individual species or the genus as a whole. The following species are recognised in the genus Nyctimystes:

 Nyctimystes avocalis Zweifel, 1958 – Loud big-eyed tree frog
 Nyctimystes bivocalis Kraus, 2012
 Nyctimystes brevipalmatus (Tyler, Martin, and Watson, 1972) – Green-thighed frog
 Nyctimystes calcaratus Menzies, 2014
 Nyctimystes cheesmani Tyler, 1964 – Cheesman’s big-eyed tree frog
 Nyctimystes cryptochrysos Kraus, 2012
 Nyctimystes daymani Zweifel, 1958 – Dayman big-eyed tree frog
 Nyctimystes disruptus Tyler, 1963 – Madang big-eyed tree frog
 Nyctimystes dux (Richards and Oliver, 2006)
 Nyctimystes eucavatus Menzies, 2014
 Nyctimystes fluviatilis Zweifel, 1958 – Indonesian big-eyed tree frog
 Nyctimystes foricula Tyler, 1963 – Kaironk big-eyed tree frog
 Nyctimystes gramineus (Boulenger, 1905) – Northern New Guinea treefrog
 Nyctimystes granti (Boulenger, 1914) – Grant's big-eyed tree frog
 Nyctimystes gularis Parker, 1936 – Mondo big-eyed tree frog
 Nyctimystes humeralis (Boulenger, 1912) – Green big-eyed tree frog
 Nyctimystes hunti (Richards, Oliver, Dahl, and Tjaturadi, 2006)
 Nyctimystes infrafrenatus (Günther, 1867) – White-lipped tree frog
 Nyctimystes intercastellus Kraus, 2012
 Nyctimystes kubori Zweifel, 1958 – Sandy big-eyed tree frog
 Nyctimystes kuduki Richards, 2007
 Nyctimystes latratus Menzies, 2014
 Nyctimystes lubisi (Oliver, Günther, Tjaturadi, and Richards, 2021)
 Nyctimystes montanus (Peters et Doria, 1878) – Mountain big-eyed tree frog
 Nyctimystes myolae Menzies, 2014
 Nyctimystes multicolor (Günther, 2004) – Multi-coloured tree frog
 Nyctimystes narinosus Zweifel, 1958 – Common big-eyed tree frog
 Nyctimystes nullicedens (Kraus, 2018)
 Nyctimystes obsoletus (Lönnberg, 1900) – Simbang big-eyed tree frog
 Nyctimystes ocreptus Menzies, 2014
 Nyctimystes pallidofemora (Kraus, 2018)
 Nyctimystes papua (Boulenger, 1897) – Papua big-eyed tree frog
 Nyctimystes perimetri Zweifel, 1958 – Archipelago big-eyed tree frog
 Nyctimystes persimilis (Zweifel, 1958) – Milne big-eyed tree frog
 Nyctimystes pterodactyla (Oliver, Richards, and Donnellan, 2019) – Pale-eyed parachuting tree frog
 Nyctimystes pulcher (Wandolleck, 1911) – Spurred big-eyed tree frog
 Nyctimystes purpureolatus (Oliver, Richards, Tjaturadi, and Iskandar, 2007)
 Nyctimystes sanguinolenta (Van Kampen, 1909) – Sabang tree frog
 Nyctimystes sauroni (Richards and Oliver, 2006)
 Nyctimystes semipalmatus Parker, 1936 – Kokoda big-eyed tree frog
 Nyctimystes trachydermis Zweifel, 1983 – Morobe big-eyed tree frog
 Nyctimystes traunae Menzies, 2014
 Nyctimystes tyleri Zweifel, 1983 – Tyler's big-eyed tree frog
 Nyctimystes zweifeli Tyler, 1967 – Zweifel's big-eyed tree frog

References

The IUCN Redlist - Nyctimystes
 Barker, J.; Grigg, G.C.; Tyler, M.J. (1995). A Field Guide to Australian Frogs. Surrey Beatty & Sons.

 
Amphibian genera
Taxa named by Leonhard Stejneger